The Assistant Secretary for the Bureau of African Affairs is the head of the Bureau of African Affairs, within the United States Department of State, who guides operation of the U.S. diplomatic establishment in the countries of sub-Saharan Africa and advises the Secretary of State and the Under Secretary for Political Affairs.

On July 18, 1958, Congress authorized an 11th Assistant Secretary of State, enabling the Department of State to create a bureau to deal with relations with the newly independent nations of Africa. At first, when the Department of State established three geographical divisions in 1909, African affairs were the responsibility of the Divisions of Near Eastern and Western European Affairs. Department Order No. 692 of June 15, 1937, transferred responsibility for all African territories except Algeria and the Union of South Africa to the Division of Near Eastern Affairs. A Division of African Affairs was created in the office of Near Eastern Affairs in January 1944. When the Bureau of Near Eastern, South Asian, and African Affairs was created, there continued to be a Division of African Affairs within that bureau.

List of Assistant Secretaries of State for African Affairs
Source:

References

 
Bureau of African Affairs
 
United States–African relations
United States diplomacy